Siddi Raju Kandriga is a village near Puttur in Andhra Pradesh state and comes under Pitchatur Mandal limits. The village president is Jayachandra Naidu.

MPPS SIDDIRAJU KANDRIGA: MPPS SIDDIRAJU KANDRIGA was established in 1936 and is managed by the Local body. It is located in a Rural area. It is located in the PITCHATUR block of the CHITTOOR district of ANDHRA PRADESH. The school consists of Grades from 1 to 5. The school is Co-educational and it doesn't have an attached pre-primary section.The school is providing mid-day meals.

ZPHS SIDDIRAJULA KANDRIGAZPHS SIDDIRAJULA KANDRIGA was established in 1984 and it is managed by the Local body. It is located in a Rural area. It is located in the PITCHATUR block of the CHITTOOR district of ANDHRA PRADESH. The school consists of Grades from 6 to 10. The school is Co-educational and it doesn't have an attached pre-primary section. The school is providing mid-day meals.

References

Villages in Tirupati district